William West Anderson (September 19, 1928 – June 9, 2017), professionally known as Adam West, was an American actor. He portrayed Batman in the 1960s ABC series of the same name and its 1966 theatrical feature film, reprising the role in various media until 2017. West began acting in films in the 1950s. He played opposite Chuck Connors in Geronimo (1962) and The Three Stooges in The Outlaws Is Coming (1965). He also appeared in the science fiction film Robinson Crusoe on Mars (1964) and performed voice work on The Fairly OddParents (2003–2008), The Simpsons (1992, 2002), and Family Guy (2000–2018), playing fictionalized versions of himself in all three.

Early life
Adam West was born William West Anderson on September 19, 1928, in Walla Walla, Washington. His father, Otto Anderson (1903–1984) was a farmer descending from Scania in southern Sweden; and his mother, Audrey Volenne (née Speer; 1906–1969) was an opera singer and concert pianist who left her Hollywood dreams to care for her family. Following her example, West told his father as a young man that he intended to go to Hollywood after completing school. He moved to Seattle with his mother when he was 15, following his parents' divorce.

West attended Walla Walla High School during his freshman and sophomore years and later enrolled in Lakeside School in Seattle. He attended Whitman College but studied at the University of Puget Sound during the fall semester of 1949. He graduated with a bachelor's degree in literature and a minor in psychology from Whitman College, where he was a member of the Gamma Zeta Chapter of the Beta Theta Pi fraternity. He also participated on the speech and debate team. 

Drafted into the United States Army, he served as an announcer on American Forces Network television. After his discharge, he worked as a milkman before moving to Hawaii to pursue a career in television.

Career

Early roles

While in Hawaii, West was picked for a role as the sidekick on a local TV program, The Kini Popo Show, which also featured a chimp named Peaches. West later took over as host of the show. In 1959, West moved with his wife and two children to Hollywood, where he took the stage name Adam West.

He appeared in the film The Young Philadelphians which starred Paul Newman. He had guest-star roles in a number of television Westerns. On three Warner Bros. Television westerns which aired on ABC—Sugarfoot, Colt .45, and Lawman—West played the role of Doc Holliday, the frontier dentist and gunfighter. West also appeared playing different characters in two episodes of Maverick opposite James Garner: "Two Tickets to Ten Strike" and "A Fellow's Brother" in 1958. He guest starred in Warner Bros. detective series Hawaiian Eye and Bourbon Street Beat.

1960s–1980s
On January 10, 1961, West appeared as a young, ambitious deputy who foolishly confronts a gunfighter named Clay Jackson, portrayed by Jock Mahoney, in the episode "The Man from Kansas" of the NBC Western series Laramie. He played Christopher Rolf in the episode "Stopover" of ABC's The Rifleman, which aired on April 25, 1961.

West made two guest appearances on Perry Mason in 1961 and 1962. His first role was as small-town journalist Dan Southern in "The Case of the Barefaced Witness". His other role was as folk singer Pete Norland in "The Case of the Bogus Books".

In 1959-1962 he became a regular on the American television series Robert Taylor's Detectives in its third season.

He made a brief appearance in the 1963 film Soldier in the Rain starring Jackie Gleason and Steve McQueen, and starred as Colonel Dan McCready, the ill-fated mission commander of Mars Gravity Probe 1 in the 1964 film Robinson Crusoe on Mars. That same year he was cast alongside William Shatner in the pilot for the proposed series Alexander the Great, playing Cleander to Shatner's Alexander. The series was not picked up and the pilot wasn't broadcast until 1968 when it was repackaged as a TV movie to capitalize on West and Shatner's later fame. West was apparently unsurprised by the rejection, later noting that "It turned out to be one of the worst scripts I have ever read and it was one of the worst things I've ever done."

In 1964, West played Dr. Clayton Harris, a handsome, young physician in two episodes of the sitcom Petticoat Junction. In the same year West starred in an episode of the ABC Outer Limits series titled "The Invisible Enemy". December 10, 1964, an episode of Bewitched titled “Love is Blind” was released, in which West played Kermit, an artist who marries Gertrude.

In 1965, he was cast in the comedy Western The Outlaws Is Coming, the last feature film starring The Three Stooges. In the same year he starred in Mara of the Wilderness and travelled to Europe to star in the Spaghetti Western The Relentless Four.

Batman

Producer William Dozier cast West as Bruce Wayne and his alter ego, Batman, in the television series Batman, in part after seeing West perform as the James Bond-like spy Captain Q in a Nestlé Quik commercial. He was in competition with Lyle Waggoner for the Batman role.

The popular campy show ran on ABC from 1966 to 1968; a feature-length film version directed by Leslie H. Martinson was released in 1966.

In 1966, West released a novelty song Miranda as his Batman character.

Also in character, West appeared in a public service announcement in which he encouraged schoolchildren to heed then-President Lyndon B. Johnson's call for them to buy U.S. savings stamps, a children's version of U.S. savings bonds, to support the Vietnam War.

In 1970, West was considered for the role of James Bond by producer Albert Broccoli for the film Diamonds Are Forever.

Post-Batman career
After his high-profile role, West, along with Burt Ward and Yvonne Craig (who played crime-fighting sidekicks Robin and Batgirl), was typecast; all three found it difficult to find other roles. West's first post-Caped Crusader role was in the film The Girl Who Knew Too Much (1969). His lead performance against type as cynical tough guy Johnny Cain did not erode his Batman image; the movie was a box office disappointment.

For a time, West made a living from personal appearances as Batman. In 1974, when Ward and Craig reprised their Batman roles for a TV public-service announcement about equal pay for women, West did not participate; instead, Dick Gautier appeared as Batman. One of West's most memorable Batman appearances, after the series had ended, was with the Memphis-based United States Wrestling Association, where he engaged in a war of words with Jerry "The King" Lawler while wearing the cowl and a tracksuit, and even name-dropping Spider-Man.

West subsequently appeared in the theatrical films The Marriage of a Young Stockbroker (1971),  The Specialist (1975), Hooper (as himself; 1978), The Happy Hooker Goes Hollywood (1980), One Dark Night (1983) and Young Lady Chatterley II (1985). West also appeared in such television films as The Eyes of Charles Sand (1972), Poor Devil (1973), Nevada Smith (1975), For the Love of It (1980) and I Take These Men (1983).

West split his time between residences in Palm Springs, California, and Ketchum, Idaho.

He did guest shots on the television series Maverick; Diagnosis: Murder; Love, American Style; Bonanza; The Big Valley; Night Gallery; Alias Smith and Jones; Mannix, Emergency!; Alice; Police Woman; Operation Petticoat; The American Girls; Vega$; Big Shamus, Little Shamus; Laverne & Shirley; Bewitched; Fantasy Island; The Love Boat; Hart to Hart; Zorro; The King of Queens; and George Lopez. West was also in an episode of Bonanza that supposedly never aired until reruns were shown and he made several guest appearances as himself on Family Feud. In 1986, he starred in the comedy police series titled The Last Precinct.

Return to Batman
West often reprised his role as Batman/Bruce Wayne, first in the short-lived animated series The New Adventures of Batman, and in other shows such as The Batman/Tarzan Adventure Hour, Tarzan and the Super 7, Super Friends: The Legendary Super Powers Show and The Super Powers Team: Galactic Guardians (succeeding original Super Friends Batman voice Olan Soule in the role). In 1979, West once again donned the Batsuit for the live-action TV special Legends of the Superheroes. In 1985, DC Comics named West as one of the honorees in the company's 50th-anniversary publication Fifty Who Made DC Great for his work on the Batman series.

West was considered to play Thomas Wayne, Bruce Wayne's father, in Tim Burton's 1989 Batman film. Originally, he wanted to play Batman. He was also a voice actor in various Batman-related animated series and films in addition to other projects connected to the TV series. West also guest starred in the Batman: The Animated Series episode "Beware the Gray Ghost" as Simon Trent, a washed-up actor who used to play a superhero in a TV series called The Gray Ghost and who now has difficulty finding work. He reprised his role of Batman in the Animaniacs episode "Boo Wonder" Season 5, Episode 3 of Animaniacs.

West even suited up one final time in the full Batman outfit in 1997 for a photo session for TV Treasures magazine #1 titled "Adam West Remembers 30 Years of Batman". He had a recurring role as the voice of Mayor Grange in the 2004-2008 WB animated series The Batman. West was the voice of Batman in the 2005 CGI-animated short film Batman: New Times. He co-starred with Mark Hamill, who vocally portrayed The Joker and had originally played the role on Batman: The Animated Series. West also voiced Thomas Wayne in a 2010 episode, "Chill of the Night!", of the cartoon series Batman: The Brave and the Bold.

In 2015, Adam West and Burt Ward announced that they would be reprising their roles as Batman and Robin (along with Julie Newmar as Catwoman) for two animated features to celebrate the oncoming 50th anniversary of the TV series. The first, Batman: Return of the Caped Crusaders was actually released in theaters for one day on October 10, 2016 prior to being released on DVD and Blu-ray. The second, Batman vs. Two-Face co-starring William Shatner as Two-Face was released on October 10, 2017, four months after West's death.

1990s–2000s

During the 1990s, West's status as a pop culture icon led to appearances as himself in the film Drop Dead Gorgeous and in several TV series, including NewsRadio, Murphy Brown, The Adventures of Pete & Pete, The Ben Stiller Show, and The Drew Carey Show. He notably appeared as "Dr. Wayne" in the 1990 Zorro episode "The Wizard", even being shown Zorro's "secret cave" headquarters. In 1991, he starred in the pilot episode of Lookwell, in which he portrayed a has-been TV action hero who falsely believes he can solve mysteries in real life. The pilot, written by Conan O'Brien and Robert Smigel in their pre-Late Night period, aired on NBC that summer, but was not picked up as a series. It was later broadcast on the Trio channel, under the "Brilliant But Cancelled" block. In 1994, West played a non-comedic role as the father of Peter Weller's character in the Michael Tolkin film The New Age.

He played a washed-up superhero in the Goosebumps television series episode "Attack of the Mutant". The boy hero is a comic book geek whose favorite superhero, Galloping Gazelle (West's character), is portrayed as fading and on the verge of retirement. Towards the end, the boy is shocked to learn that the Gazelle is real, though he (the boy) must save the day by himself.

In 1994, West, with Jeff Rovin, wrote his autobiography, Back to the Batcave published by Berkeley Books. In 1997, Virgin Interactive released the gambling simulation game Golden Nugget. West acted in the video cut scenes of the "Chaos Mystery" storyline subgame. In 2001, he played the super-villain Breathtaker on the short-lived television series Black Scorpion.

In 2003, West and Burt Ward starred in the television movie Return to the Batcave: The Misadventures of Adam and Burt, alongside Frank Gorshin, Julie Newmar, and Lee Meriwether. Jack Brewer portrayed West in flashbacks to the production of Batman. In 2005, West appeared in the CBS show The King of Queens. In the episode, Spence first asks Lou Ferrigno to go to a sci-fi convention, but when Spence meets West (playing himself), he leaves Ferrigno and asks West to come with him. He appears prominently in the 2006 video for California band STEFY's song "Chelsea" as "Judge Adam West", presiding over the courtroom scene.

In 2007, West appeared in a recurring role on George Lopez, as an attorney for George's mother, and he starred as "The Boss" in the movie comedy Sexina: Popstar PI. Following the release of a Batman game, a host of the show X-Play visited West on the show. In 2009, West played himself in the episode "Apollo, Apollo" of 30 Rock.

2010s

In 2010, a Golden Palm Star on the Palm Springs Walk of Stars was dedicated to him. West received the 2,468th star on the Hollywood Walk of Fame on April 5, 2012. His star is located at 6764 Hollywood Boulevard in front of the Guinness Museum in Hollywood, California.

West appeared in a number of videos for Funnyordie.com.

He was interviewed in 2013 on the PBS series called Pioneers of Television in the season-three episode called "Superheroes". Also in 2013, he was the subject of the documentary Starring Adam West.

West is among the interview subjects in Superheroes: A Never-Ending Battle, a three-hour documentary narrated by Liev Schreiber that premiered on PBS in October 2013.

In February 2016, West guest-starred as himself on the 200th episode of The Big Bang Theory.

In January 2017, West appeared on the British comedy panel show "Through the Keyhole" in which viewers and panellists looked around West's Los Angeles home by video.

Walla Walla, Washington, Adam West's hometown, officially celebrates its annual "Adam West Day" on September 19, with the first one celebrated in 2017.

Voice-over work and advertising

Having a distinctive voice, West built a career doing voice-over work on a number of animated series (often as himself), including appearances on The Simpsons, Futurama, Rugrats, Histeria!, Kim Possible, and Johnny Bravo.

He also appeared in many episodes of Nickelodeon's cartoon The Fairly OddParents as a cat-obsessed version of himself, who is famous for playing a superhero called Catman, and who actually believes he is Catman. His later appearance in The Fairly OddParents was a parody of himself, hired to play the role of the Crimson Chin in the movie of the same name. Yet another appearance on the show had him as himself in a fairy-sponsored video about how to cope with losing one's fairy godparents. In later seasons, West was replaced by Jeff Bennett since his death in 2017.

In 1997, West appeared in a national television advertising campaign for Ziebart.

From 2000, West made regular appearances on the animated series Family Guy, on which he played the fictional character of the same name, who was the lunatic mayor of Quahog, Rhode Island. His role brought West a new wave of popularity post-Batman, and lead writer Seth MacFarlane claims to have gone out of his way to avoid typecasting West by deliberately not making any references to Batman.

Some of his last voice-over performances were playing the role of Uncle Art in the Disney Animation film Meet the Robinsons, and voicing the young Mermaid Man (along with Burt Ward, who voiced the young Barnacle Boy) in the cartoon show SpongeBob SquarePants, in the episode "Back to the Past" in 2010.

West also played the voice of General Carrington in the video game XIII, and voiced other video games such as Marc Eckō's Getting Up: Contents Under Pressure, Chicken Little: Ace in Action, Scooby-Doo! Unmasked, and Goosebumps: Attack of the Mutant.

In November 2014, West voiced himself, the 1960s version of Batman, and the Gray Ghost in the video game Lego Batman 3: Beyond Gotham.

In 2016, West was the voice of TV's Batman for the Batman '66 pinball game produced by Stern Pinball Incorporated.

West also did voice-over work for superhero-themed commercials for the investment firm LendingTree and television commercials for Hebrew National hot dogs.

Personal life

West was married three times. His first marriage was to his college girlfriend Billie Lou Yeager in 1950. The couple divorced six years later. In 1957, he married Cook Island dancer Ngatokorua Frisbie Dawson, part of the Puka Puka Otea in Hawaii. They had two children before their divorce in 1962. West then married Marcelle Tagand Lear in November 1970. They had two children and remained together for more than 46 years, until West's death. West also had two step-children.

During the Batman television series, West's relationship with co-star Burt Ward was jokingly described as "problematic". He said, "Burt fell victim to making up stories to sell books. But in a way it was flattering, because he made me sound like King Kong." West also said that he played Batman "for laughs, but in order to do [that], one had to never think it was funny. You just had to pull on that cowl and believe that no one would recognize you." Also during the Batman series, he became close friends with crossover co-star Van Williams, who played The Green Hornet. The two of them were also neighbors for a while and spent much time together outdoors, including fishing and hunting.

Death
On June 9, 2017, West died from leukemia in Los Angeles at the age of 88. In a statement, his former Batman co-star and longtime friend Burt Ward said: Batman: The Animated Series actor Kevin Conroy (who performed alongside West in the episode "Beware the Gray Ghost") said: On June 15, 2017, Los Angeles projected the Bat-Signal on City Hall as a tribute to West, and in his hometown of Walla Walla, Washington, the Bat-Signal was shone upon the landmark Whitman Tower.

West had pre-recorded five more Family Guy episodes as Mayor Adam West, which were released posthumously as part of the sixteenth season. He also recorded the 11th episode of Powerless, which never aired due to the show's cancellation. NBC aired the episode online after West's death.

West's last public appearances were from March to April 2017 at the NorthEast ComicCon & Collectibles Extravaganza in Hanover, Massachusetts, where he was the guest of honor, Fan Expo Dallas, and the second annual Silicon Valley Comic Con.

Filmography

Film

Television

Video games

References

Sources

External links

 
 
 
 
 
 That Time Adam West Had a Conversation With Himself on 'Batman' on Hollywood Reporter
 Día de los Muertos, Batman! Adam West Honored in Old Town on Times of San Diego
 Adam West, Straight-Faced Star of TV's 'Batman,' Dies at 88 on Hollywood Reporter
 Adam West fans mourn the loss of Batman under the Bat signal in Los Angeles on Los Angeles Times
 Adam West – a life in pictures on The Guardian
 

1928 births
2017 deaths
20th-century American comedians
20th-century American male actors
21st-century American comedians
21st-century American male actors
American male comedians
American male comedy actors
American male film actors
American male television actors
American male video game actors
American male voice actors
American people of Swedish descent
Comedians from Washington (state)
Deaths from cancer in California
Deaths from leukemia
Inkpot Award winners
Lakeside School alumni
Male actors from Washington (state)
Military personnel from Washington (state)
People from Walla Walla, Washington
United States Army soldiers
Western (genre) television actors
Whitman College alumni